The Triple Crown of Thoroughbred Racing, often shortened to Triple Crown, is a series of horse races for Thoroughbreds, often restricted to three-year-olds. Winning all three of these Thoroughbred horse races is considered the greatest accomplishment in Thoroughbred racing. The term originated in mid-19th-century England and nations where Thoroughbred racing is popular each have their own Triple Crown series.

English Triple Crowns 
In England, where the term Triple Crown originated with West Australian's three wins in 1853, it is made up of:

 The 2,000 Guineas Stakes, run over 1 mile (1,609 metres) at Newmarket Racecourse in Newmarket, Suffolk
 The Derby, run over 1 mile 4 furlongs and 10 yards (2,423 metres) at Epsom Downs Racecourse in Epsom, Surrey
 The St Leger Stakes, run over 1 mile 6 furlongs and 132 yards (2,937 metres) at Town Moor in Doncaster, Yorkshire

Since the 2,000 Guineas was first run in 1809, fifteen horses (including three winners of substitute races at Newmarket during the First World War) have won the English Triple Crown. The most recent – and only winner since World War II – was Nijinsky, in 1970. For many years, it was considered unlikely that any horse would ever win the English Triple Crown again. In the winter of 2006/2007, however, trainer Jim Bolger was training his unbeaten colt Teofilo for the Triple Crown and bookmaker William Hill plc was offering odds of only 12/1 against Teofilo winning the 2007 Triple Crown. The horse was withdrawn from the 2000 Guineas two days before the race after suffering a setback and never raced again.

Since Nijinsky, only Nashwan (1989), Sea the Stars (2009), and Camelot (2012) have won both the Guineas and the Derby. Between Reference Point in 1987 and Camelot in 2012, no Derby winner (not even the potential Triple Crown winners Nashwan and Sea the Stars) even entered the St. Leger. This reluctance to compete in the St. Leger is said to be because of the impact it would have on a horse's stud value in a market where speed is preferred to stamina.

Triple Crown winners
For a list of the annual individual race winners, see English Triple Crown race winners.

Triple Crown winners:

†Wartime winners Pommern, Gay Crusader and Gainsborough are not counted, according to many judges, as the three races were all held at Newmarket and racing itself was too disrupted. By this reckoning, there were only 12 triple crown winners, and only three in the 20th century.

Failed Triple Crown attempts
The following horses won the 2000 Guineas and Derby but were beaten in the St Leger:
 Cotherstone (1843): second to Nutwith
 Pretender (1869): fourth to Pero Gomez
 Shotover (1882): third to Dutch Oven
 Ayrshire (1888): sixth to Seabreeze
 Ladas (1894): second to Throstle
 St. Amant (1904): seventh and last to Pretty Polly
 Minoru (1909): fourth to Bayardo
 Manna (1925): tenth to Solario
 Cameronian (1931): tenth and last to Sandwich
 Camelot (2012): second to Encke

Additionally:
 Blue Peter won 2000 Guineas and Derby in 1939 but St Leger was cancelled due to World War II.

Fillies Triple Crown

There is also a Fillies Triple Crown for a filly winning the 1,000 Guineas Stakes, Epsom Oaks and St. Leger Stakes. In the past, this was not considered a true Triple Crown as the best fillies would often run in the Derby and Two Thousand Guineas. As this is no longer the case, the Fillies' Triple Crown would now be considered as comparable as the original. Winners of the Fillies Triple Crown are:
 Formosa – 1868 (also dead heated in the Two Thousand Guineas)
 Hannah – 1871
 Apology – 1874 (also won the Ascot Gold Cup)
 La Fleche – 1892 (also won the Ascot Gold Cup)
 Sceptre – 1902 (also won the Two Thousand Guineas)
 Pretty Polly – 1904
 Sun Chariot – 1942
 Meld – 1955
 Oh So Sharp – 1985

Stayers' Triple Crown

The so-called Stayers Triple Crown consists of the most prestigious long-distance races in the British flat racing season:
 The Ascot Gold Cup, raced over 2m 4f during Royal Ascot, 
 The Goodwood Cup, raced over 2m during the Goodwood Festival,
 The Doncaster Cup, raced over 2m 2f during the St Leger Festival.

United States Triple Crowns

In the United States, the three races that make up the Triple Crown are:

Triple Crown winners

Triple Tiara
There have been several different versions of the Triple Tiara (sometimes known as the Filly Triple Crown) in the United States. One of them was a national version that consisted of undercard events on the same weekends as the associated Triple Crown races:
Only one filly won this version of the Triple Tiara, Davona Dale in 1979. Few have even tried as the short time between the Kentucky Oaks and Black-Eyed Susan is generally considered too short for fillies.

The most commonly accepted version of the Triple Tiara is the American Triple Tiara of Thoroughbred Racing which uses three races from New York. From 1957 to 2002, and 2007 to 2009, these three races were the Acorn Stakes, the Mother Goose Stakes, and the Coaching Club American Oaks. Eight fillies won this version of the New York Triple Tiara:
 Dark Mirage – 1968
 Shuvee – 1969
 Chris Evert – 1974
 Ruffian – 1975
 Davona Dale – 1979
 Mom's Command – 1985
 Open Mind – 1989
 Sky Beauty – 1993

In 2010, the NYRA changed the configuration of the Triple Tiara to include the Alabama Stakes instead of the Mother Goose. As of 2022, no filly has won the reconfigured Triple Tiara.

New York Handicap Triple 

The New York Handicap Triple is a series of three handicap races run in New York. Although historically notable, the series is now essentially defunct, as two of the races are run on the same day, making a sweep impossible. In addition, only the Metropolitan Handicap maintains a top-level designation and continues to be run as a handicap. The series consists of:

The triple has been won by four horses:

 Whisk Broom II – 1913
 Tom Fool – 1953
 Kelso – 1961
 Fit to Fight – 1984

Turf Triple Series 
In 2019, the New York Racing Association established two series of races for three-year-olds on the turf: the Turf Trinity and the Turf Tiara. As of 2021, neither has been swept by a singular horse.

The Turf Trinity consists of:

The Turf Tiara consists of:

Ireland
The Irish Triple Crown, modelled on the English equivalent, consists of:
For a list of the annual individual race winners, see Irish Triple Crown race winners.

Only two horses have won all three races since the Irish Two Thousand Guineas was first run in 1921:
 Museum – 1935
 Windsor Slipper – 1942

Canada

The Canadian Triple Crown consists of:
 King's Plate
 Prince of Wales Stakes
 Breeders' Stakes

Triple Crown winners
The Canadian Triple Crown was established in 1959 and since then seven horses have won it. In 2014, the Hall of Fame decided to honor the five horses who had won the three races before 1959, meaning 12 horses are now officially recognized as winning the Canadian Triple Crown.

Pre-1959 establishment
 Queensway (filly) – 1932
 Archworth – 1939
 Uttermost – 1945
 Ace Marine – 1955
 Canadian Champ – 1956

Since 1959 establishment
 New Providence – 1959
 Canebora – 1963
 With Approval – 1989
 Izvestia – 1990
 Dance Smartly (filly) – 1991
 Peteski – 1993
 Wando – 2003

Triple Tiara
The Canadian Triple Tiara consists of:
 Woodbine Oaks (formerly the Canadian Oaks)
 Bison City Stakes
 Wonder Where Stakes

As of 2022, only one filly has won it: 

 Sealy Hill  – 2007

Australia
The Australian Triple Crown comprises the following races:

The Australian Triple Crown initially included the Canterbury Guineas, which was replaced with the Randwick Guineas.

Triple Crown winners

 Moorland – 1943
 Martello Towers – 1959
 Imagele – 1973
 Octagonal – 1996
 Dundeel – 2013

The Spring Grand Slam
The Spring Grand Slam for older horses consists of:

The only horse to win the Spring Grand Slam was the New Zealand bred Rising Fast in 1954.

The Two Year Old Triple Crown
The Two-Year-Old Triple Crown, also known as the Two-Year-Old Grand Slam, consists of:

Winners of the Two-Year-Old Triple Crown:
 Baguette – 1970
 Luskin Star – 1977
 Tierce – 1991
 Burst (filly) – 1992
 Dance Hero – 2004
 Pierro – 2012

New Zealand
The New Zealand Triple Crown consists of:

The New Zealand Triple Crown is also known as the Hawke's Bay Triple Crown or Hastings Triple Crown as all three races are run there.
 
The only horse to win the New Zealand Triple Crown is Melody Belle in 2019.

New Triple Crown Series
Three new Triple Crown series were announced for the 2019/2020 season. Each series consists of three prestigious Group races with a $100,000 bonus for the winner of all three races.

The Weight-For-Age Triple Crown

 Zabeel Classic at Ellerslie Racecourse
 Herbie Dyke Stakes at Te Rapa
 New Zealand Stakes at Ellerslie Racecourse

The Sprint Triple Crown

 Railway Stakes at Ellerslie Racecourse
 Telegraph Stakes at Trentham
 Waikato Sprint Stakes at Te Rapa

The Fillies And Mares Triple Crown

 Cuddle Stakes at Trentham
 Breeders Stakes at Te Aroha
 Travis Stakes at Te Rapa

Germany
In Germany, the Triple Crown (Dreifache Krone) consists of

Only one horse has won the German Triple Crown:

 Königsstuhl – 1979

In East Germany, the Dreifache Krone consisted of:
 Frühjahrszuchtpreis der Dreijährigen
 Derby der DDR (Derby of GDR)
 Großer Herbstpreis der Dreijährigen

Three horses won the East German Triple Crown:

 Faktotum – 1955
 Gidron – 1979
 Lomber – 1987

France
The French Triple Crown consists of:

Previously the French Triple Crown consisted of:
 Poule d'Essai des Poulains
 Prix du Jockey Club

Two horses have swept the French Triple Crown:
 Zut – 1879
 Perth – 1899

The French Fillies Triple Crown consists of:

Four fillies have won all three races:
 Nikellora – 1945
 Corteira – 1948
 Allez France – 1973
 Zarkava – 2008

Previously the French Triple Crown for fillies consisted of:
 Poule d'Essai des Pouliche
 Prix de Diane
 Prix Royal-Oak

No filly ever won the series.

Japan 
Japan has two sets of races referred to as Triple Crowns.

Japanese Triple Crown

Eight horses have won the Japanese Triple Crown:
 St Lite – 1941
 Shinzan – 1964
 Mr. C.B. – 1983
 Symboli Rudolf – 1984
 Narita Brian – 1994
 Deep Impact – 2005
 Orfevre – 2011
 Contrail – 2020

Japanese Triple Tiara

From 1976 to 1995, the Queen Elizabeth II Commemorative Cup was the third leg.

Six horses have won the Japanese Triple Tiara:
 Mejiro Ramonu – 1986
 Still in Love – 2003
 Apapane – 2010
 Gentildonna – 2012
 Almond Eye – 2018
 Daring Tact – 2020

Argentina

The three races that comprise the Triple Crown in Argentina are:

Winners of the Argentinian Triple Crown are:
 Pippermint – 1902
 Old Man – 1904
 Melgarejo – 1906
 Chopp – 1908
 Botafogo – 1917
 Mineral – 1931
 Silfo – 1934
 Sorteado – 1938
 Embrujo – 1939
 Yatasto – 1951
 Tatán – 1954
 Manantial – 1958
 Gobernado – 1964
 Forli – 1966
 Telescópico – 1978
 El Serrano – 1986
 Refinado Tom – 1996
A Quadruple Crown adding the Gran Premio Carlos Pellegrini, run over  miles on the turf and open to older horses, is also recognised. Winners are:

 Pippermint – 1902
 Old Man – 1904
 Botafogo – 1917
 Mineral – 1931
 Yatasto – 1951
 Manantial – 1958
 Forli – 1966
 Telescópico – 1978

The Argentinian Filly Triple Crown consists of:

Gran Premio Jockey Club
Gran Premio Nacional (Argentine Derby)

Winners of the Argentinian Filly Triple Crown are:

 Sierra Balcarce – 1930
 La Mission  – 1940 (also won Gran Premio Carlos Pellegrini)

Additionally, a San Isidro Colt Triple Crown and San Isidro Filly Triple Crown are recognised. The San Isidro Colt Triple Crown consists of:

Winners of the San Isidro Colt Triple Crown are:

 Chullo – 1997
 Asidero – 1999
 Hi Happy – 2015

The San Isidro Filly Triple Crown consists of:

 Gran Premio Jockey Club
 Gran Premio Carlos Pellegrini

As of 2021, no horse has won all three races.

Brazil 
Brazil has triple crowns run at multiple tracks, including at Hipódromo da Gávea (Rio de Janeiro) and at Hipódromo de Cidade Jardim (São Paulo).

The Rio de Janeiro Triple Crown consists of:

Winners are:

 Talvez! – 1941
 Criolan – 1942
 Quiproquó – 1953
 Timão – 1956
 Escorial – 1959
 African Boy – 1979
 Old Master – 1984
 Itajara – 1987
 Groove – 1996
 Super Power – 2000
 Plenty of Kicks – 2012
 Bal a Bali – 2014

Prior to 1963, the Rio de Janeiro Triple Crown consisted of the Grande Prêmio Outono ( on turf), Grande Prêmio Cruzeiro do Sul, and Grande Prêmio Distrito Federal ( on turf). From 1963 to 1993, it consisted of the Grande Prêmio Estado do Rio de Janeiro, Grande Prêmio Cruzeiro do Sul, and Grande Prêmio Jockey Club Brasileiro ( on turf). From 1994 to 2003, the order of the Grande Prêmio Jockey Club Brasileiro and Grande Prêmio Cruzeiro do Sul were reversed in order. The current configuration started in 2004.

The Rio de Janeiro Filly Triple Crown consists of:

Winners are:

 Indian Chris – 1991
 Virginie – 1997
 Be Fair – 2000
 Old Tune – 2012
 No Regrets – 2017
 Janelle Monae – 2021

The São Paulo Triple Crown consists of:

Winners are:

 Jacutinga – 1933
 Funny Boy – 1936
 El Faro – 1943
 Estouvado – 1944
 Farwell – 1959
 Giant – 1967
 Cacique Negro – 1989
 Quari Bravo – 1997
 Roxinho – 2001
 Fixador – 2013
 Halston – 2018

Historically, the São Paulo Triple Crown ran without the Grande Prêmio Jockey Club de São Paulo, with the Grande Prêmio Consagração ( on a turf track) being run as the third and final leg.

The São Paulo Filly Triple Crown consists of:

Winners are:

 Dulce – 1957
 Olhada – 1961
 Jembélia – 1963
 Emerald Hill – 1977
 Colina Verde – 2006
The Rio Grande do Sul Triple Crown, as of 1985, consists of:

 Grande Prêmio Cel.

Winners are:

 Interstar – 1985

Chile
The three races that comprise the Triple Crown in Chile are:

Winners of the Chilean Triple Crown are:
 Cachaporal – 1885
Dorama – 1915
 Tutti Frutti – 1928
Freire – 1930
 Grimsby – 1939
 Tabano – 1946
 Empire – 1951
 Eugenia – 1956
 Prólogo – 1966
 Wolf – 1991
Additionally, the Hipódromo Chile has multiple recognized Triple Crowns. The Filly Triple Crown consists of:

 Clásico Alberto Solari Magnasco, run over  run on a dirt track

There have been four winners:

 Cremcaramel – 1999
 Printemps – 2000
 Amani – 2011
 Wow Cat – 2017

The Triple Crown consists of:

 Clásico St. Leger

There have been eight winners:

 Geologo – 1984
 Lido Palace – 2000
 Trotamondo – 2004
 Hakassan – 2012
 Incentive Boy – 2015
 Big Daddy – 2016
 Wow Cat † – 2017
 Cariblanco – 2018

† Designates a filly winner

Chile also has a Two-Year-Old Triple Crown, with all three races run on turf at Valparaiso Sporting Club. It consists of:

 Clásico El Estreno [Nicanor Señoret], run over 
 Clásico Gran Premio Gonzalo Bofill De Caso, run over  
 Clásico Copa de Plata Italo Traverso, run over  

There have been five winners:

 Campo Marzio – 1991
 Barrio Chino – 1992
 Early Gray – 1993
 Castelnuovo – 1994
 Sandy Bay – 2016

Peru 
The Peruvian Triple Crown consists of:

Winners are:

 Don Manuel – 1936/1937
 Pulgarín – 1941/1942
 Imperio – 1948/49
 Llanero – 1950/51
 Río Pallanga – 1955/56
 Perigold – 1957/58
 Daré – 1962/63
 Trastévere – 1968/69
 Santorín – 1973
 Vaduz – 1979
 Stash – 1992
 Grozny – 1998
 Muller – 2006
 Super Nao – 2021

The Peruvian Filly Triple Crown consists of:

 Derby Nacional

Winners are:

 Monona – 1944/45
 Pamplona – 1959/60
 Batuka – 1999

Winners are:

 Pamplona – 1959/60
 Santorín – 1973
 Stash – 1992
 Super Nao – 2021

Horses that have won any combination of three of the above races are also sometimes considered Triple Crown winners. Horses that have done this are:

 Premier – 1947/1948
 Won Gran Premio Ricardo Ortíz de Zevallos, Derby Nacional, Gran Premio Nacional Augusto B. Leguia
 Insuperable – 1949/1950
 Won Polla de Potrillos, Gran Premio Ricardo Ortíz de Zevallos, Gran Premio Nacional Augusto B. Leguia
 Tenaz – 1972
 Won Polla de Potrillos, Gran Premio Ricardo Ortíz de Zevallos, Gran Premio Nacional Augusto B. Leguia
 Acropolitana – 1974
 Won Polla de Potrances, Gran Premo Enrique Ayulo Pardo, Gran Premio Nacional Augusto B. Leguia
 Tattoo – 1982
 Won Polla de Potrillos, Gran Premio Ricardo Ortíz de Zevallos, Gran Premio Nacional Augusto B. Leguia
 Mari July – 1990
 Won Polla de Potrances, Gran Premo Enrique Ayulo Pardo, Gran Premio Nacional Augusto B. Leguia

Hong Kong 
The Triple Crown series at Hong Kong's Sha Tin Racecourse consists of three races at increasingly longer distances. Unlike most other Triple Crown events, these races are not confined to three-year-olds. They are:
 Hong Kong Stewards' Cup, run over 
 Hong Kong Gold Cup, run over 
 Hong Kong Champions & Chater Cup, run over 

The only horse to win the Hong Kong Triple Crown is:

 River Verdon – 1994

There are two other Triple Crown series: the Hong Kong Speed Series and the Four-Year-Old Classic Series.

Hong Kong Speed Series (International Group 1):

 Centenary Sprint Cup, run over 
 Queen's Silver Jubilee Cup, run over 
 Chairman's Sprint Prize, run over 
Winners of the Hong Kong Speed Series are:

 Mr. Vitality – 1995/96
 Grand Delight – 2002/03
 Silent Witness – 2003/04, 2004/05

Four-Year-Old Classic Series (Listed Race):

Restricted to four-year-old horses.

 Hong Kong Classic Cup, run over 
 Hong Kong Classic Mile, run over 
 Hong Kong Derby, run over 
Winners of the Four-Year-Old Classic Series are:

 Rapper Dragon – 2017
 Golden Sixty – 2020

Italy
The Triple Crown series consists of:

Three horses have swept the Italian Triple Crown:

 Niccolo dell'Arca – 1941
 Gladiolo – 1946
 Botticelli – in 1954

The Italian Fillies' Triple Crown consists of:
 Premio Regina Elena (1000 Guineas)
 Oaks d'Italiano (Italian Oaks)
 St. Leger Italiano

No filly has swept all three races, but Jacopa de Sellaio won the Premio Parioli, Derby Italiano, Premio Regina Elena, and Oaks d'Italia in 1932.

Uruguay 
The three races that comprise the Triple Crown in Uruguay are:

This combination of races received some publicity outside of Uruguay in 2006. The 2005 Triple Crown winner Invasor, after being sold to Sheik Hamdan bin Rashid Al Maktoum's Shadwell Racing and sent to be raced in the United States, went on to win three Grade I races in 2006 before winning that year's Breeders' Cup Classic. He finished the year as the top-ranked horse in the 2006 World Thoroughbred Racehorse Rankings, and won the 2007 Dubai World Cup before being retired to stud following a training injury.

Uruguayan Triple Crown winners are:
 Ricaurte – 1913
 Benz – 1917
 Liniers – 1919
 Sisley – 1923
 Lancier – 1926
 Marquito – 1927
 Zorzalero – 1932
 Romántico – 1936
 Lord Coty – 1943
 Luzeiro – 1949
 Bizancio – 1951
 Scooter – 1954
 Zumbador – 1960
 Locoloco – 1962
 Chocon – 1971
 Hampstead – 1977
 Monacilio – 1980
 Amodeo – 1988
 Parsiphal – 1994
 Invasor – 2005
 Sir Fever – 2014
The Uruguayan Filly Triple Crown consists of:

 Gran Premio Jockey Club
 Gran Premio Nacional

Uruguayan Filly Triple Crown winners are:

 Verona – 1915

Other Triple Crowns in European countries

Belgium 
The Belgian Triple Crown consists of:
 Poule d'Essai des Poulains (Belgian 2000 Guineas)
 Derby Belge
 St. Leger Belge

Known Triple Crown winners in Belgium are:
 Kitty – 1926
 Bayeux – 1947
 Soudard – 1971
 Epsiba – 1980
 Camiros – 1982
 Abbey's Grey – 1989
 Super Native – 1990

The Fillies' Triple Crown in Belgium consists of:

 Poule d'Essai des Pouliches (Belgian 1000 Guineas)
 Prix de Gustave Roy de Blicquy (Belgian Oaks)
 St. Leger Belge

One filly is known to have won all three races:
 Domitillia – 1959

Hungary 
The Hungarian Triple Crown consists of:
 Nemzeti dij (Hungarian 2000 Guineas)
 Magyar Derby (Hungarian Derby)
 Magyar St. Leger (Hungarian St. Leger)

Hungarian Triple Crown winners are:
 Try Well – 1936
 Bilbao – 1977
 April Sun – 1999
 Saldenzar – 2007
 Quelindo – 2015

The Hungarian Fillies' Triple Crown (not officially listed by the Hungarian racing authorities) consists of:

 Hazafi dij (Hungarian 1000 Guineas)
 Magyar Kancadíj (Hungarian Oaks)
 Magyar St. Leger (Hungarian St. Leger)

No filly has swept the Hungarian Fillies' Triple Crown.

Switzerland 
In Switzerland, the Triple Crown series consists of:
 Swiss Derby (2400 metres, turf, Frauenfeld)
 Swiss 2000 Guineas (1600 metres, turf, at Zurich)
 Swiss St. Leger

The Swiss Fillies Triple Crown consists of:
 Swiss Oaks
 Swiss 1000 Guineas (1600 metres, turf)
 Swiss St. Leger

One horse has won the Swiss Triple Crown.

 Majofils – 2006

Denmark 
In Denmark, the Triple Crown series consists of:
 Dansk Derby
 Dansk Forarslob (Danish 2000 Guineas)
 Dansk St. Leger

Three horses have won the Danish Triple Crown:
 Sunbeam – 1939
 Asa Thor – 1945
 Hallo – 1946

The Danish Filly Triple Crown consists of:
 Dansk Oaks
 Marowinalob (Danish1000 Guineas)
 Dansk St. Leger

One filly has swept all three races:
 Rossard – 1983

Rossard was one of the most successful runners in Denmark's history, being a Grade One winner in the US. She later became a good broodmare, with her son Unusual Heat being a leading sire in California.

Sweden 
The Swedish Triple Crown consists of:
 Svenskt Derby
 Jockeyklubbens Jubileumslöpning (Swedish Two Thousand Guineas)
 Svenskt St. Leger

Three horses have swept the Swedish Triple Crown:
 Birgit – 1940
 Coast Guard – 1952
 Homosassa – 1985

The Swedish Filly Triple Crown consists of:
 Dianalöpning (Swedish One Thousand Guineas)
 Svensk Oaks
 Svenskt St. Leger

One filly has swept all three races:
 Wonderbird – 1953

Norway 
The Norwegian Triple Crown series consists of:
 Norsk 2000 Guineas
 Norsk Derby
 Norsk St. Leger

Eight horses have swept the Norwegian Triple Crown:
 Cato – 1943
 Sally – 1944
 Primadonna – 1945
 Askepot – 1948
 Trainer's Seat – 1976
 Dalby Jaguar – 1981
 Sunorius – 1987
 Without Fear – 2011
 Privilegiado – 2019

The Norwegian Filly Triple Crown consists of:
 Norsk 1000 Guineas
 Norsk Oaks
 Norsk St. Leger

No filly has won all three races.

The Netherlands 
The Dutch Triple Crown consists of:
 Hengsten Productenren (Dutch 2000 Guineas)
 Dutch Derby
 Dutch St. Leger

The following horses have won the Dutch Triple Crown:
 Tosto – in 1951
 Sans Valeur – 1954
 Jolly Peter – 1959
 Jolly Jinks – 1966
 Frances Hope – 1976
 Ishamo – 1981
 Boxberger Speed – 1982
 Boxberger Civano – 1984
 Sydney Raaphorst – 1985
 Double Fun – 2002

The Dutch Fillies' Triple Crown consists of:
 Merries Productenren (Dutch 1000 Guineas)
 Diana-prijs (Dutch Oaks)
 Dutch St. Leger

The following horses have swept the series:
 Ramana – 1947
 Qualissa – 1949 (also won the Dutch Derby)
 Que Sara – 1967
 Queen of Roses S – 1973 (also won the Dutch Derby)
 Libelle – 1980
 Carmona – 1983

The Dutch Triple Crown races, except the Dutch Derby and possibly the Dutch Oaks, have not been run since around 2008.

Turkey 
The Turkish Triple Crown consists of:
 Erkek Tay Deneme (Turkish 2000 Guineas – 1,600 m)
 Gazi Derby (Turkish Derby – 2,400 m)
 Ankara Stakes (Turkish St. Leger – 2,800 m)

Champions of the Turkish Triple Crown are:
 Sadettin – 1970
 Karayel – 1973
 Seren.1 – 1983
 Ugurtay – 1985
 Hafız – 1986
 Bold Pilot – 1996
 Grand Ekinoks – 2001

The Turkish Fillies' Triple Crown (not officially recognized by Turkish racing authorities) consists of:
 Disi Tay Deneme (Turkish 1000 Guineas)
 Kisrak (Turkish Oaks)
 Ankara Stakes (Turkish St. Leger)

Fillies that have swept this series are:
 Suphan – 1965
 Minimo – 1971 (also won the Turkish Derby)

Spain 
The Spanish Triple Crown series consists of:
 Premio Cimera (Spanish 2000 Guineas)
 Premio Villapadierna (Spanish Derby)
 Premio Villamejor (Spanish St. Leger)

Two horses have swept the Spanish Triple Crown:
 Dual Sea – 1975
 Arkaitz – in 2014

The Triple Crown for fillies consists of:
 Premio Valderas (Spanish 1000 Guineas)
 Premio Beamonte (Spanish Oaks)
 Premio Villamejor (Spanish St. Leger)

One filly has swept all three races:
 Tokara – 1962

Poland 
In Poland, the Triple Crown (Potrójna korona) consists of:
 Nagroda Rulera, Polish 2000 Guineas, Warsaw, 1600 m
 Służewiec Derby, Polish Derby, Warsaw, 2400 m
 Nagroda St. Leger, Warsaw, 2800 m

Known Polish Triple Crown winners are:
 Liège – 1917
 Mat – 1934
 Jeremi – 1938
 Ruch – 1948
 Solali – 1961
 Dipol – 1972
 Czerkies – 1974
 Krezus – 1989
 Mokosz – 1992
 Dżamajka (filly) – 2000
 Dancer Life – 2002
 Dżesmin – 2005
 San Moritz – 2007
 Intens – 2011
 Va Bank – 2015
 Bush Brave – 2017
 Fabulous Las Vegas – 2018

The classic races for fillies are:
 Nagroda Wiosennej (1000 Guineas)
 Nagroda Liry (Oaks)

No filly is known to have won the Polish Fillies' Triple Crown, which would conclude with the St. Leger. The Polish St. Leger is now open to 3-year-olds and up.

Triple Crowns in other countries

India 
The Indian Triple Crown consists of:

 Indian 2000 Guineas
 Indian Derby
 Indian St. Leger

All three races are run at Mahalaxmi Racecourse in Mumbai. The St. Leger was run at Pune between 1970 and 1990, before being shifted to Mumbai. It is now again being run in Pune.

Ten horses have won the Indian Triple Crown:

 Commoner – 1953/54
 Loyal Manzar – 1961/62
 Prince Pradeep – 1963/64
 Red Rufus – 1966/67
 Our Select – 1967/68
 Squanderer – 1976/77
 Almanac – 1981/82
 Astonish – 1991/92
 Indictment – 1997/98
 Smart Chieftain – 1999/00

The Indian Fillies Triple Crown consists of:

 Indian 1000 Guineas
 Indian Oaks
 Indian St. Leger

One filly has swept the series for fillies:
 Her Majesty – 1947/48

Kenya 
The Kenya Triple Crown series is run at Ngong Racecourse, in Nairobi, and consists of:
 Kenya Derby ( miles)
 Kenya Guineas (1 mile)
 Kenya St. Leger ( miles)

The three races have been won by:
 Heron – 1972
 Manuscript – 1978
 Pretty Witch (filly) – 1981
 Morningstar – 1990
 Kings Pattern – 1994
 Hawker Fury – 2017
 Silverstone Air – 2019

The Kenya Fillies' Triple Crown consists of:
 Kenya Fillies Guineas (1 mile)
 Kenya Oaks ( miles)
 Kenya St. Leger ( miles)

The three races have been won by:
 Windsong – 1999
 Happy Times – 2015
 Western Ballad – 2016

Macau 
In Macau, the Macau Jockey Club introduced the Triple Crown Series in 2008, with three races all held in Taipa Racecourse, Macau:
 Director's Cup, Macau Group 2 Race, 
 Macau Cup, Macau Group 2 Race, 
 Macau Gold Cup, Macau Group 1 Race, 

In 2009 Macau Jockey Club changed the series for 4-year-old horses:
 Macau Guineas, Macau Group 1 Race, only for 4-year-old horses
 Macau Derby, Macau Group 1 Race, only for 4-year-old horses
 Macau Gold Cup, Macau Group 1 Race, 

In 2010, Luen Yat Forever become the first and, to date, only horse to win the Macau Triple Crown.

Mexico 
The Mexican Triple Crown series consists of:

 Derby Mexicano (9 furlongs)
 Stakes Jockey Club Mexicano (8 furlongs)
 Gran Premio Nacional ( furlongs).
All three races are contested at Hippodromo de las Americas, in Mexico City.

Mexican Triple Crown winners:
 Plucky Flag (filly) – 1946
 Re-Torta (filly) – 1949
 Cachava (filly) – 1966
 Gran Zar – 1979
 Pikotazo – 1980
 Dominciano – 2002
 Huitlacoche – 2015
 Kukulkan – 2018

The Mexican Fillies' Triple Crown series consists of :
 Clasico Rubi (7 furlongs)
 Clasico Esmeralda (8 furlongs)
 Clasico Diamante ( furlongs).
All three races are contested at Hippodromo de las Americas, in Mexico City.

Mexican Filly Triple Crown winners:
 She's a Lady Race – 2005
 That's Life – 2007
 Vivian Record – 2009
 Kutzamala – 2018
Giovannia – 2020

Barbados 
The Barbados Triple Crown of Thoroughbred Racing is a series of thoroughbred horse races run annually at Garrison Savannah Racetrack near Bridgetown, Barbados, consisting of races of increasing distance:

 Barbados Guineas
 Midsummer Creole Classic
 Barbados Derby

The winners of the Barbados Triple Crown have been:

 Watermeet (filly) – 1972
Ginger Lilly (filly) – 1980
Coo-Bird – 1989
 Incitatus – 1996
 Zouk (filly) – 2006
 Areutalkintome – 2009

Dominican Republic 
The three races that comprise the Triple Crown in the Dominican Republic are:

 Clásico Matías Ramón Mella
 Clásico Francisco del Rosario Sanchez
 Clásico Juan Pablo Duarte

The winners of the Dominican Republic Triple Crown have been:

 Cibao – 1979
 Amor Mio – 1980
 Senorita Cuquina – 1982
 Dr. Calderon – 1985
 Candice Akemi – 1990
 J. Robert – 1991
 Sweet Honey – 1997
 Excelencia – 2005
 Matty Alou – 2007
 Sicótico – 2008
 Fratello Martino – 2015
 Tango Dancer – 2016
 Inmenso – 2017
Cadeau de Alcalá – 2019
Huracán P. – 2020

Jamaica 
The Jamaican Triple Crown series at Caymanas Park consists of:

 Jamaican 2000 Guineas
 Jamaican Derby
 Jamaican St. Leger

The winners of the Jamaican Triple Crown are:

 Royal Dad – 1981
 Monday Morning – 1987
 Lui Chie Pooh – 1988
 Milligram – 1992
 War Zone – 1996
 I'm Satisfied – 2000
 Mark My Words – 2010
She's a Maneater – 2017
Supreme Soul – 2019

The Jamaican Fillies' Triple Crown at Caymanas Park consists of:

 Jamaican 1000 Guineas
 Jamaican Oaks
 Jamaican St. Leger

The winners of the Jamaican Fillies' Triple Crown are:

 Vestia – 1993
 Simply Magic – 2000
 Alsafra – 2008

Panama 
The Panamanian Triple Crown consists of:

 Arturo, Eric Arturo & Eric Arturo Delvalle,  miles on dirt
 Augosto Samuel Boyd Paredes,   miles on dirt
 Carlos y Fernando Eleta Almaran,  miles on dirt

All of the races are conducted at the Hipódromo Presidente Remon

The winners of the Panamanian Triple Crown have been:

Pindín – 1964
Tojo – 1966
Iván – 1967
Eugenio – 1972
Montecarlo – 1973
El Manut – 1976
El Gran Capo – 1978
Leonardo – 1992
El Chacal – 1994
Rey Arturo – 1995
Evaristo – 1998
Spago – 2004
Oxsai – 2008
Voy Porque Voy – 2010
Señor Concerto – 2019
The Panamanian Filly Triple Crown consists of:

 Temistocles Diaz Q.,  miles on dirt
 Tomás G. Duque y Tomás A. Duque,  miles on dirt
 Raúl (Lul) Arango, Raúl (Baby) Arango, y Roberto (Bob) Arango Chiari,  miles on dirt

Winners of the Panamanian Filly Triple Crown include:

 Monkey Business – 2015
 Chantik – 2016
 Lady Valery – 2017

Puerto Rico 

The Triple Crown series at Puerto Rico's Camarero Racetrack consists of three races at increasingly longer distances. They are:
 Derby Puertorriqueño at 1,700 metres (8½ furlongs) held in the first Sunday of May
 Copa Gobernador at 1,800 metres (9 furlongs) held in the end of May
 Copa San Juan at 1,900 metres (9½ furlongs) held in the last Sunday of June

The Puerto Rico Triple Crown winners are:
 Camarero – 1954
 Cardiologo – 1961
 El Rebelde – 1966
 Hurly Road – 1981
 Vuelve Candy B – 1991
 Cherokee Pepper – 1999
 Estrellero – 2001
 Mediavilla R – 2002
 Don Paco – 2011
 Arquitecto – 2012
 Lluvia de Nieve – 2014
Justiciero – 2017
Ledoux – 2019
Consolador – 2021

Ecuador 
1980 – present
Ecuador has two sets of races referred to as Triple Crowns:

Ecuador Triple Crown
 Clásico Estreno Dr. Raúl Lebed Sigall, at Hipódromo BUIJO in Samborondón
 Clásico Polla Nacional Sr. Agustin Febres Cordero, at Hipódromo BUIJO in Samborondón
 Clásico Derby Nacional Sr.Benjamin Rosales A., at Hipódromo BUIJO in Samborondón

Ecuador Fillies' Triple Crown
 Clásico Ing. Carlos San Andres, at Hipódromo BUIJO in Samborondo
 Clásico Sr. Eduardo Jairala F, at Hipódromo BUIJO in Samborondó
 Clásico Abogado Carlos Julio Arosemena Peet, at Hipódromo BUIJO in Samborondón

Pre-1980
In Ecuador, the Triple Crown consists of:

 Clásico Nelson Uraga Suarez, at Hipódromo Santa Cecilia in Guayaquil
 Clásico Enrique Guzman Aspiazu, at Hipódromo Santa Cecilia in Guayaquil
 Clásico Inginiero Ignacio De Icaza Aspiazu, at Hipódromo Santa Cecilia in Guayaquil
Winners of the Ecuadoran Triple Crown are:

 Miss Florida
 Banantia
 Capo Di Monte II
 Alcatraz – 1967
 Pechiche
 Farsante – 1971

Venezuela 
Venezuela has two sets of races referred to as Triple Crowns.

The Venezuelan Official Triple Crown consists of:
 Clásico José Antonio Páez, at Hipódromo La Rinconada in Caracas
 Clásico Cría Nacional (former Clásico Ministerio de Agricultura y Cría), at Hipódromo La Rinconada in Caracas
 Clásico República de Venezuela (Venezuelan Derby), at Hipódromo La Rinconada in Caracas
Winners of the Venezuelan Triple Crown, since 1956, are:

 Gradisco – 1960
 El Corsario – 1972
 Iraquí – 1985
 Catire Bello – 1992
 Polo Grounds – 2005
 Taconeo – 2007
 El Gran Cesar – 2008
 Water Jet – 2010
 Raffsttar – 2020

The Venezuelan Fillies' Triple Crown consists of:
 Clásico Hipódromo La Rinconada, at Hipódromo La Rinconada in Caracas
 Clásico Prensa Hípica Nacional, at Hipódromo La Rinconada in Caracas
 Clásico General Joaquín Crespo, at Hipódromo La Rinconada in Caracas
Filly Triple Crown winners are:

 Lavandera – 1971
 Segula C. – 1974
 Blondy – 1978
 Gelinotte – 1980
 Lady and Me – 1991
 Cantaura – 1992
 Miss Marena – 1994
 Starship Miss – 1999
 Front Stage – 2000
 Bambera – 2009
 Ninfa del Cielo – 2014
 Afrodita de Padua – 2019
 Sandovalera – 2021

Philippines 
The Philippines Triple Crown series are held at San Lazaro Leisure Park (first leg), Santa Ana Park (second leg), and MetroTurf Racing Complex (third leg) at unknown lengths and it's winners include:

 Fair and Square – 1981
 Skywalker – 1983
 Time Master – 1987
 Magic Showtime – 1988
 Sun Dancer – 1989
 Strong Material – 1996
 Real Top – 1998
 Silver Story – 2001
 Hagdang Bato – 2012
 Kid Molave – 2014
 Sepfourteen – 2017
 Heneral Kalentong – 2020

Trinidad and Tobago 
The three races that comprise the triple crown of Trinidad and Tobago were established in 1983 and they are:

 Easter Guineas
 Midsummer Classic Stakes
 Trinidad Derby

The Trinidad and Tobago triple crown winners are

Pre 1983:

 Bright Light – 1952
 Darjeeling – 1954
 Shalimar – 1958
 Happy Landing – 1960
 Aurelian – 1963
 Chip Chip – 1967
 Royal Colours – 1982

After 1983:

 Sky Rocket – 1986
 Carnival Messiah – 2001
 Momentum – 2014
Wise Guy – 2020

Undefeated Triple Crown winners
The following horses won their Triple Crown when still undefeated. Those marked with an asterisk retired undefeated.

 Ormonde* (1886), United Kingdom
 Isinglass (1893), United Kingdom
 Bahram* (1935), United Kingdom
 Windsor Slipper* (1942), Ireland
 Camarero (1954), Puerto Rico
 Gradisco (1960), Venezuela
 Nijinsky (1970), United Kingdom
Emerald Hill (1977), Brazil
 Seattle Slew (1977), United States
 El Gran Capo (1978), Panama
 Pikotazo (1980), Mexico
 Royal Dad (1981), Jamaica
 Symboli Rudolf (1984), Japan
Itajara* (1987), Brazil
Virginie (1997), Brazil
Grozny (1998), Peru
 Excelencia (2005), Dominican Republic
 Deep Impact (2005), Japan
 Invasor (2005), Uruguay
 Water Jet (2010), Venezuela
Fixador (2013), Brazil
 Va Bank (2015), Poland
 Justify* (2018), United States
 Kukulkan (2018), Mexico
 Contrail (2020), Japan
 Daring Tact (2020), Japan
 Andrew Goltra (2022), U-Gym

Individual Triple Crown winners

Only three jockeys have won the Triple Crown with different horses (i.e., rode horses to Triple Crowns in different years):

 Steve Donoghue (United Kingdom : 1915, Pommem; 1917 Gay Crusader)
 Eddie Arcaro (United States: 1941, Whirlaway; 1948, Citation)
 Emisael Jaramillo (Venezuela: 2005, Polo Grounds; 2007, Taconeo; 2010, Water Jet)

At least two jockeys is known to have won all three of a country's Triple Crown races in the same year on different horses:
 Luis Contreras (Canada, 2011: Queen's Plate, Inglorious; Prince of Wales Stakes and Breeders' Stakes, Pender Harbour)
 Alfredo García Paduani (Venezuela, 2016: Clásico José Antonio Páez and Clásico Cría Nacional, Ocean Bay; Clásico República Bolivariana de Venezuela, Gran Will)

One trainer is known to have accomplished the same feat as Contreras and García Paduani:
 D. Wayne Lukas (USA, 1995: Kentucky Derby, Thunder Gulch; Preakness Stakes, Timber Country; Belmont Stakes, Thunder Gulch)

Back to back Triple Crown winners (jockeys)
Don Seymour (Canada)
 1989 – With Approval
 1990 – Izvestia

Javier Santiago (Puerto Rico)
 2001 – Estrellero
 2002 – Mediavilla R

Most Triple Crown winners (jockeys)

Winston Grifiths – Jamaica (5)

1981 – Royal Dad
1988 – Liu Chie Poo
1992 – Milligram
2001 – I'msatisfied
2002 – Simply Magic (filly)

Alexis Feliciano – Puerto Rico (3)
1991 – Vuelve Candy B
1999 – Cherokee Pepper
2011 – Don Paco

Emisael Jaramillo – Venezuela (3)
2005 – Polo Grounds
2007 – Taconeo
2010 – Water Jet

See also
 List of leading Thoroughbred racehorses
 United States Triple Crown of Thoroughbred Racing

References

 
Horse races in Canada
Horse racing in Australia
Triple Crown of Thoroughbred Racing
Horse racing in Japan
Racing series for horses